The 1986 Barnet Council election took place on 8 May 1986 to elect members of Barnet London Borough Council in London, England. The whole council was up for election and the Conservative party stayed in overall control of the council.

Background

Election result
Overall turnout in the election was 42.0%.

|}

Ward results

Arkley

Brunswick Park

Burnt Oak

Childs Hill

Colindale

East Barnet

East Finchley

Edgware

Finchley

Friern Barnet

Garden Suburb

Golders Green

Hadley

Hale

Hendon

Mill Hill

St Paul’s

Totteridge

West Hendon

Woodhouse

By-elections between 1986 and 1990

Hadley

The by-election was called following the resignation of Cllr. Beverley G. Lane.

Garden Suburb

The by-election was called following the resignation of Cllr. Clement Halfon.

Arkley

The by-election was called following the death of Cllr. Leah Hertz.

Garden Suburb

The by-election was called following the resignation of Cllr. Coral Sebag-Montefiore.

Arkley

The by-election was called following the death of Cllr. Wilfred Lipman.

References

1986
1986 London Borough council elections